Lizwi Vilakazi (born 15 December 1969), is a South African actor. He is best known for the roles in the films Mandela: Long Walk to Freedom and Five Fingers for Marseilles.

Career
He started career with minor guest starring roles on television series as drama Zone 14 telecast on SABC1 and the e.tv drama 4Play: Sex Tips for Girls. In South African television, he is best known for the role as 'Teddy' in the Vuzu Amp drama series aYeYe. With the success of this role, he continued to dominate in South African television with numerous serials such as Isithembiso, Jacob's Cross, The Road and Umlilo.

In 2017, he was selected for a minor role in the biographical film Mandela: Long Walk to Freedom. He played the role as a 'voter'. However, in 2019, he made a major role in the critically acclaimed South African Western thriller film Five Fingers for Marseilles directed by Michael Matthews. The film had mostly positive reviews and screened at several international film festivals.

Television serials
 Zone 14 - Season 3 as Little Jimmy
 4Play: Sex Tips for Girls - Season 1 as Howie
 aYeYe - Season 1 as Teddy
 Isithembiso - Season 1, 2 and 3 as Tiro
 Jacob's Cross - Season 4 as Newspaper Seller
 Jacob's Cross - Season 5 as Drug Dealer
 Single Guyz - Season 1 as Young guy (as Lwizi Vilakazi)
 The Road - Season 1 as Kortes
 Umlilo - Season 2 and 3 as Muzi

Filmography

See also
 List of South African films

References

External links
 
 Local is LEKKER

Living people
South African male film actors
South African male television actors
1969 births